Cristian Valentin Zaharia (born 8 July 1967) is a Romanian former professional handball player and current coach. He competed in the men's tournament at the 1992 Summer Olympics.

Honours

Team
Dinamo Bucharest
Romanian League: 1986
Romanian Cup: 1988

HK Drott
Swedish League: 1991

Pontault-Combault
French Second Division: 1994

References

1967 births
Living people
Romanian male handball players
CS Dinamo București (men's handball) players
HK Drott players
Romanian expatriate sportspeople in Sweden
Romanian expatriate sportspeople in Germany
Romanian expatriate sportspeople in France
Romanian expatriate sportspeople in the United States
Olympic handball players of Romania
Handball players at the 1992 Summer Olympics
Romanian handball coaches
Place of birth missing (living people)